The Patriotic Coalition for Yugoslavia (Patriotska koalicija za Jugoslaviju) was a political alliance in Montenegro which ran in 2002 parliamentary election. The coalition members were:

 People's Socialist Party of Montenegro 
 Serbian Radical Party
 Yugoslav Left

The coalition won 9,920 votes, or 2.85% and received none of the 75 seats, failing to pass the electoral threshold. It was dissolved shortly after the election.

References

Defunct political party alliances in Montenegro
Politics of Serbia and Montenegro
Serb political parties in Montenegro